The Evening Standard Theatre Award for Best Actress, also known as the Natasha Richardson Award for Best Actress since 2009, is an annual award presented by the Evening Standard in recognition of achievement in British theatre.

Winners and nominees

1950s

1960s

1970s

1980s

1990s

2000s

2010s

2020s

Multiple awards and nominations

Awards 
Six awards
 Maggie Smith
Four awards
 Vanessa Redgrave
Three awards
 Peggy Ashcroft
 Judi Dench
Two awards
 Eileen Atkins
 Geraldine McEwan
 Diana Rigg
 Fiona Shaw
 Janet Suzman
 Dorothy Tutin

Nominations 
Four nominations
 Billie Piper
 Kristin Scott Thomas
Three nominations
 Helen McCrory
 Penelope Wilton
Two nominations
Sinéad Cusack
 Victoria Hamilton
 Clare Higgins
 Cecilia Noble
 Sheridan Smith
 Juliet Stevenson
 Lia Williams

See also 

 Laurence Olivier Award for Best Actress
 Critics' Circle Theatre Award for Best Actress
 Tony Award for Best Actress in a Play

References

External links 

 Evening Standard Theatre Award Winners 1980-2003
Evening Standard Theatre Awards 1955-2000
Theatre acting awards
Award ceremonies
Evening Standard Awards
Awards for actresses